The 75th Innovation Command (75th IC) is a separate command of the United States Army Reserve.

The 75th IC was activated as the 75th Infantry Division in World War II. Inactivated in 1945, it was reactivated in 1952 at Houston, Texas, from the assets of the disbanded 22nd Armored Division of the United States Army Organized Reserves.  It was active as an Infantry Division from 1952 to 1957, when it was reorganized and redesignated as the 75th Maneuver Area Command (MAC), and given responsibility for planning and conducting Field Training Exercises (FTX) and Command Post Exercises (CPX) for all Reserve Component units west of the Mississippi River. In 1993, the 75th MAC was redesignated as the 75th Division (Training Support) in the Army Reserve, which in later years became designated the 75th Training Command. In January 2003, numerous units of the 75th were mobilized to train other Army Reserve and Army National Guard units deploying overseas in support of Operation Iraqi Freedom/Operation Enduring Freedom (OIF/OEF).  In January 2018, the 75th was reorganized into the 75th Innovation Command with its training divisions reassigned to the 84th Training Command.

Lineage
Constituted 24 December 1942, in the Army of the United States as Headquarters, 75th Infantry Division.
Activated 15 April 1943, at Fort Leonard Wood, Missouri.
Moved to Louisiana Maneuver Area on 24 January 1944, where it participated in the 4th Army  # 6 Louisiana maneuvers.
Transferred to Camp Breckinridge, Kentucky on 7 April 1944.
Staged at Camp Shanks, New York, on 7 November 1944.
Deployed from New York Port of Embarkation on 14 November 1944.
Arrived in England on 22 November 1944. Some troops spent time training at Seabank Hotel in Porthcawl, Wales.
Assigned 9 December 1944, to the Ninth Army, which was part of the 12th Army Group.
Further assigned 11 December 1944, to the XVI Corps.
Landed in France on 13 December 1944.
Crossed over into the Netherlands on 18 December 1944.
Further assigned 22 December 1944, to the VII Corps, First Army (attached to the British 21st Army Group), 12th Army Group.
Further assigned 29 December 1944 to the XVIII (Abn) Corps.
Further assigned 2 January 1945 to the VII Corps.
Further assigned 7 January 1945 to the XVIII (Abn) Corps.
Further assigned 25 January 1945 to the 6th Army Group.
Further assigned 30 January 1945 to the XXI Corps, Seventh Army, 6th Army Group, but attached for operations to the First French Army, 6th Army Group.
Further assigned 11 February 1945 to the Seventh Army, 6th Army Group.
Further assigned 14 February 1945 to the 12th Army Group.
 Further assigned 17 February 1945 to the Ninth Army, 12th Army Group, but attached to the British Second Army for operations and the British VIII Corps for administration. Entered Belgium.
Withdrew to the Netherlands on 18 February 1945.
Finally assigned 1 March 1945 to the XVI Corps, Ninth Army, 12th Army Group.
Entered Germany on 10 March 1945.
Was located at Werdohl, Germany, on 14 August 1945
Returned to Continental US at Hampton Roads Port of Embarkation on 14 November 1945, and proceeded to Camp Patrick Henry, Virginia.
Inactivated 14 November 1945, at Camp Patrick Henry, Virginia.
Allotted 21 February 1952, to the Organized Reserve Corps.
Activated 1 March 1952, at Houston, Texas.
(Organized Reserve Corps redesignated 9 July 1952 as the Army Reserve).
Redesignated 15 February 1957 as the 75th Maneuver Area Command (MAC) at Houston, Texas.
Redesignated 1 October 1993 as Headquarters, 75th Division (Exercise) at Houston, Texas.
Reorganized and redesignated 17 October 1999 as Headquarters, 75th Division (Training Support).
Redesignated 2 November 2007 as 75th Battle Command Training Division (BCTD)
Redesignated 1 October 2011 as 75th Training Division (Mission Command), later 75th Training Command (Mission Command)
Redesignated January 2018 as 75th Innovation Command

World War II

Units
 Headquarters, 75th Infantry Division
 289th Infantry Regiment
 290th Infantry Regiment
 291st Infantry Regiment
 Headquarters and Headquarters Battery, 75th Infantry Division Artillery
 730th Field Artillery Battalion (155 mm)
 897th Field Artillery Battalion (105 mm)
 898th Field Artillery Battalion (105 mm)
 899th Field Artillery Battalion (105 mm)
 275th Engineer Combat Battalion 
 375th Medical Battalion
 75th Cavalry Reconnaissance Troop (Mechanized)
 Headquarters, Special Troops, 75th Infantry Division
 Headquarters Company, 75th Infantry Division
 775th Ordnance Light Maintenance Company
 75th Quartermaster Company 
 575th Signal Company 
 Military Police Platoon
 Band
 75th Counterintelligence Corps Detachment

Combat chronicle

These combat chronicles, current as of October 1948, are drawn from The Army Almanac: A Book of Facts Concerning the Army of the United States.

The 75th Infantry Division arrived in Britain, 22 November 1944; headquarters having arrived on 2 November 1944.  After a brief training program, the division landed at Le Havre and Rouen, 13 December, and bivouacked at Yvetot on the 14th.  When the Von Rundstedt offensive broke in the Ardennes, the 75th was rushed to the front and entered defensive combat, 23 December 1944, alongside the Ourthe River, advanced to the Aisne River, and entered Grandmenil, 5 January 1945. The division relieved the 82d Airborne Division along the Salm River, 8 January, and strengthened its defensive positions until 17 January when it attacked, taking Vielsalm and other towns in the area.

Shifting to the Seventh Army area in Alsace—Lorraine, the 75th crossed the Colmar Canal, 1 February, and took part in the liberation of Colmar and in the fighting between the Rhine River and the Vosges Mountains. It crossed the Marne-Rhine Canal and reached the Rhine, 7 February.  After a brief rest at Lunéville, it returned to combat, relieving the 6th British Airborne Division on a   defensive front along the Meuse (Maas), near Roermond, in the Netherlands, on 21 February. From 13 to 23 March, the 75th patrolled a sector along the west bank of the Rhine from Wesel to Homburg, and probed enemy defenses at night.

On 24 March, elements crossed the Rhine in the wake of the 30th and 79th Divisions. Pursuit of the enemy continued as the 75th cleared the Haard Forest, 1 April, crossed the Dortmund-Ems Canal on the 4th, and cleared the approaches to Dortmund, which fell to the 95th Division, 13 April. Around the same time, troops of the division liberated Stalag VI-A, a POW camp where thousands of Soviet and Polish prisoners of war had died of malnutrition and disease. After taking Herdecke, 13 April, the division moved to Braumbauer for rest and rehabilitation, then took over security and military government duties in Westphalia. The father of Randy Pausch was wounded and received a Bronze Star during this time, as related in The Last Lecture.

Casualties
Total battle casualties: 4,324
Killed in action: 817
Wounded in action: 3,314
Missing in action: 77
Prisoner of war: 116

Honors

Campaign participation credit

World War II:
Rhineland;
Ardennes-Alsace;
Central Europe

Unit awards
Meritorious Unit Commendation (Army) for EUROPEAN THEATER, HHC, 1st Brigade, 75th Division (now HHC, Southern Division, 75th Training Command)
Army Superior Unit Award Streamer Embroidered 2003 (all UICs received one)
Army Superior Unit Award Streamer Embroidered 2006

Individual awards
Distinguished Service Cross-4
Silver Star-114
Legion of Merit-3
Soldier's Medal-21
Bronze Star Medal-1,288
Air Medal-29

Commanders

Command Sergeants Major

Current units
Also now known as the U.S. Army Reserve Innovation Command (USARIC), as of January 2018, this unit was designated as the 75th Innovation Command and all previously subordinate units outside of headquarters and headquarters company were assigned to the 84th Training Command.

Current Mission: "The 75th Innovation Command drives operational innovation, concepts, and capabilities to enhance the readiness and lethality of the Future Force by leveraging the unique skills, agility, and private sector connectivity of America's Army Reserve."  USARIC is designed to be in direct support of Army Futures Command.  With a requirement for senior officers and NCOs to research and publish thought leadership, there are several publications across disciplines by its members.

Current Commander and Command Sergeant Major are MG Martin F. Klein and CSM Kristal Florquist. Current Deputy Commander is BG Robert E. Guidry.

USARIC Headquarters and Headquarters Company – Houston, Texas
Headquarters and Headquarters Company – Houston, Texas
Innovation Army Application Group - Austin, Texas
Group 1
Group 2
Group 3
Support Group - Aberdeen Proving Ground

Notable members
J. W. Milam – Small businessman in Mississippi, known for confessing to lynching black teenager Emmett Till in a magazine interview after acquittal by a local all-white jury
 Father of Randy Pausch, author of The Last Lecture

General
Shoulder patch: Khaki-bordered square with diagonal fields of blue, white, and red on which is superimposed a blue 7 and red 5.

References

External links
 The official home page of the 75th Training Command
 The 75th: The Story of the 75th Infantry Division
  "Unofficial" Home of the 75th Infantry Division Veterans' Association
75th Infantry Division (WWII) Unofficial Homepage
75th Division (Post-WWII) Unofficial Homepage
 "PICTURES OF SOLDIERS OF THE 75th Infantry Division 899th Field Artillery IN WW2"
75th Infantry Division
 "75th Infantry Division," by Bill Schiller, Lisa Thompson (2002)

Military units and formations established in 1943
Training divisions of the United States Army